Bagua Grande is a town in northern Peru, capital of Utcubamba Province, in the region Amazonas. It has an estimated 42,396 inhabitants, having changed from a rural to an urban area after experiencing much immigration in the 1960s. It is called by their inhabitants Corazón de Amazonas (Spanish: "Heart of Amazonas").

Geography

Climate
The urban area is located on a hillside by the river Utcubamba, now merged with Cajaruro District, is very warm, fertile and rainy for most of the year.

Economy
The economy is based on trade and agricultural production, especially of very high-quality rice, corn and coffee; trade is active with the cities of Chiclayo, Jaén and the neighboring department of San Martín. It has minor industries, of hulled and rice mills and bottling carbonated water.

References

External links
Local newspaper

Populated places in the Amazonas Region